The bright-rumped yellow finch (Sicalis uropygialis) is a species of bird in the family Thraupidae.
It is found in the Puna grassland : Peru, Bolivia and northern Chile and Argentina.
Its natural habitats are subtropical or tropical high-altitude grassland and heavily degraded former forest.

References

bright-rumped yellow finch
Birds of the Puna grassland
bright-rumped yellow finch
Taxonomy articles created by Polbot
Taxobox binomials not recognized by IUCN